Ludwig Andreas von Feuerbach (28 July 1804 – 13 September 1872) was a German anthropologist and philosopher, best known for his book The Essence of Christianity, which provided a critique of Christianity that strongly influenced generations of later thinkers, including Charles Darwin, Karl Marx, Sigmund Freud, Friedrich Engels, Richard Wagner, and Friedrich Nietzsche.

An associate of Young Hegelian circles, Feuerbach advocated atheism and anthropological materialism. Many of his philosophical writings offered a critical analysis of religion. His thought was influential in the development of historical materialism, where he is often recognized as a bridge between Hegel and Marx.

Life and career 
Feuerbach was the third  son of the eminent jurist Paul Johann Anselm Ritter von Feuerbach, brother of mathematician Karl Wilhelm Feuerbach and uncle of painter Anselm Feuerbach. Feuerbach's other brothers were almost all distinguished in scholarship or science:
 Joseph Anselm Feuerbach (1798–1851), archaeology and philology; his son was the painter Anselm Feuerbach (1829–1880)
 Eduard August Feuerbach (1803–1843), jurisprudence
 Friedrich Heinrich Feuerbach (1806–1880), philology and philosophy
He also had three sisters:
 Rebekka Magdalena "Helene" Feuerbach von Dobeneck (1808–1891)
 Leonore Feuerbach (1809–1885)
 Elise Feuerbach (1813–1883)

Education
Feuerbach matriculated in the University of Heidelberg in 1823 with the intention of pursuing a career in the Lutheran church. Through the influence of Karl Daub he was led to an interest in the then predominant philosophy of Hegel and, in spite of his father's opposition, enrolled in the University of Berlin in 1824 in order to study under the master himself. After two years, the Hegelian influence began to slacken. Feuerbach became associated with a group known as the Young Hegelians, alternately known as the Left Hegelians, who synthesized a radical offshoot of Hegelian philosophy, interpreting Hegel's dialectic march of spirit through history to mean that existing Western culture and institutional forms—and, in particular, Christianity—would be superseded. "Theology," he wrote to a friend, "I can bring myself to study no more. I long to take nature to my heart, that nature before whose depth the faint-hearted theologian shrinks back; and with nature man, man in his entire quality." These words are a key to Feuerbach's development. He completed his education at the University of Erlangen (he matriculated there in 1827) with the study of natural science. He earned his doctorate from Erlangen on 25 July 1828 with his thesis De infinitate, unitate, atque, communitate, rationis (On the Infinitude, Unity, and Universality of Reason), while he habilitated there in November 1828 with his thesis De ratione una, universali, infinita (The One, Universal, and Infinite Reason).

Early writings
His first book, published anonymously, Gedanken über Tod und Unsterblichkeit (1830), contains an attack on personal immortality and an advocacy of the Spinozistic immortality of reabsorption in nature. These principles, combined with his embarrassed manner of public speaking, debarred him from academic advancement. After some years of struggling, during which he published his Geschichte der neueren Philosophie (2 vols., 1833–1837, 2nd ed. 1844), and Abelard und Heloise (1834, 3rd ed. 1877), he married in 1837 and lived a rural existence at Bruckberg near Nuremberg, supported by his wife's share in a small porcelain factory.

In two works of this period, Pierre Bayle (1838) and Philosophie und Christentum (1839), which deal largely with theology, he held that he had proven "that Christianity has in fact long vanished not only from the reason but from the life of mankind, that it is nothing more than a fixed idea."

Das Wesen des Christentums (The Essence of Christianity)
His most important work, Das Wesen des Christentums (1841), was translated by Mary Ann Evans (later known as George Eliot) into English as The Essence of Christianity.

Feuerbach's theme was a derivation of Hegel's speculative theology in which the Creation remains a part of the Creator, while the Creator remains greater than the Creation. When the student Feuerbach presented his own theory to professor Hegel, Hegel refused to reply positively to it.

In part I of his book Feuerbach develops what he calls the "true or anthropological essence of religion". Treating of God in his various aspects "as a being of the understanding", "as a moral being or law", "as love" and so on, Feuerbach talks of how humankind is equally a conscious being, more so than God because humans have placed upon God the ability of understanding. Humans contemplate many things and in doing so they become acquainted with themselves. Feuerbach shows that in every aspect God corresponds to some feature or need of human nature. As he states: In the consciousness of the infinite, the conscious subject has for his object the infinity of his own nature.

Instead, Feuerbach concludes, "If man is to find contentment in God, he must find himself in God."

Thus God is nothing else than human: he is, so to speak, the outward projection of a human's inward nature. This projection is dubbed as a chimera by Feuerbach, that God and the idea of a higher being is dependent upon the aspect of benevolence. Feuerbach states that "a God who is not benevolent, not just, not wise, is no God", and continues to say that qualities are not suddenly denoted as divine because of their godly association. The qualities themselves are divine therefore making God divine, indicating that humans are capable of understanding and applying meanings of divinity to religion and not that religion makes a human divine.

The force of this attraction to religion, though, giving divinity to a figure like God, is explained by Feuerbach as God is a being that acts throughout humans in all forms. God "is the principle of [man's] salvation, of [man's] good dispositions and actions, consequently [man's] own good principle and nature." It appeals to humankind to give qualities to the idol of their religion because without these qualities a figure such as God would become merely an object, its importance would become obsolete, there would no longer be a feeling of an existence for God. Therefore, Feuerbach says, when humans remove all qualities from God, "God is no longer anything more to him than a negative being". Additionally, because humans are imaginative, God is given traits and there holds the appeal. God is a part of a human through the invention of a God. Equally, though, humans are repulsed by God because "God alone is the being who acts of himself".

In part II, he discusses the "false or theological essence of religion", i.e. the view which regards God as having a separate existence over against humankind. Hence arise various mistaken beliefs, such as the belief in revelation which he considers not only injures the moral sense but also "poisons, nay destroys, the divinest feeling in man, the sense of truth", and the belief in sacraments such as the Lord's Supper, which is to him a piece of religious materialism of which "the necessary consequences are superstition and immorality".

A caustic criticism of Feuerbach was delivered in 1844 by Max Stirner. In his book Der Einzige und sein Eigentum (The Ego and His Own). The pertinent portions of the two books, Feuerbach's reply, and Stirner's counter-reply form an instructive polemic (see external links).

After 1848
During the troubles of 1848–1849 Feuerbach's attack upon orthodoxy made him something of a hero with the revolutionary party; but he never threw himself into the political movement, and indeed lacked the qualities of a popular leader. During the period of the Frankfurt Congress he had given public lectures on religion at Heidelberg. When the diet closed he withdrew to Bruckberg and occupied himself partly with scientific study, partly with the composition of his Theogonie (1857).

In 1860 he was compelled by the failure of the porcelain factory to leave Bruckberg, and he would have suffered the extremity of want but for the assistance of friends supplemented by a public subscription. His last book, Gottheit, Freiheit und Unsterblichkeit, appeared in 1866 (2nd ed., 1890). After his second stroke incapacitated him in 1870, collections were made to aid his financial state, mainly through the Social Democratic Party of Germany, which he then joined the same year. He died on September 13, 1872. He is buried in Johannis-Friedhof Cemetery in Nuremberg, which is also where the artist Albrecht Dürer is interred.

Philosophical work
Essentially the thought of Feuerbach consisted in a new interpretation of religion's phenomena, giving an anthropological explanation. Following Schleiermacher’s theses, Feuerbach thought religion was principally a matter of feeling in its unrestricted subjectivity. So the feeling breaks through all the limits of understanding and manifests itself in several religious beliefs. But, beyond the feeling, is the fancy, the true maker of projections of "Gods" and of the sacred in general.

Works
 De ratione una, universali, infinita (1828) (inaugural dissertation) (digitized by Google from the library of Ghent University).
 Gedanken über Tod und Unsterblichkeit (1830).
 
 Abälard und Heloise, Oder Der Schriftsteller und der Mensch (1834).
 Kritik des Anti-Hegels (1835). 2nd edition, 1844. University of Michigan; University of Wisconsin.
 Geschichte der Neuern Philosophie; Darstellung, Entwicklung und Kritik der Leibniz'schen Philosophie (1837). University of Wisconsin.
 Pierre Bayle (1838). University of California.
 Über Philosophie und Christenthum (1839).
 Das Wesen des Christenthums (1841). 2nd edition, 1848 (online).
  The Essence of Christianity (1854). Tr. Marian Evans. St. Mary's. 2nd edition, 1881. Oxford.
 Grundsätze der Philosophie der Zukunft (1843). Gallica.
 Vorläufige Thesen zur Reform der Philosophie (1843).
 Das Wesen des Glaubens im Sinne Luther's (1844). Harvard.
 Das Wesen der Religion (1846). 2nd edition, 1849. Stanford.
 Erläuterungen und Ergänzungen zum Wesen des Christenthums (1846).
 Ludwig Feuerbach's sämmtliche Werke (1846–1866).
 Volume 1, 1846. Gallica; NYPL.
 Volume 2, 1846. Gallica.
 Volume 3, 1847. Gallica; NYPL. 1876, Oxford.
 Volume 4, 1847. Gallica; Oxford.
 Volume 5, 1848. Gallica; NYPL.
 Volume 6, 1848. Gallica; NYPL.
 Volume 7, 1849. Gallica; Oxford.
 Volume 8, 1851. Gallica; NYPL.
 Volume 9, 1857. Gallica; NYPL.
 Volume 10, 1866. Gallica; NYPL.
 Ludwig Feuerbach in seinem Briefwechsel und Nachlass (1874). 2 volumes. Oxford. Vol. 1. NYPL. Vol. 2. NYPL.
 Briefwechsel zwischen Ludwig Feuerbach und Christian Kapp (1876). Harvard; Oxford.

Critical reception
According to Mathilde Blind:

Influence
Karl Marx and Friedrich Engels were strongly influenced by Feuerbach's atheism, although they criticised him for his inconsistent espousal of materialism. Recently, Feuerbach was "reunderstood" as one of the forerunners of modern media theory.

Engels would make the following comment on Feuerbach's Essence of Christianity: "One must himself have experienced the liberating effect of this book to get an idea of it. Enthusiasm was general; we all became at once Feuerbachians. How enthusiastically Marx greeted the new conception and how much — in spite of all critical reservations — he was influenced by it, one may read in The Holy Family."

See also 

 Theses on Feuerbach by Karl Marx (1845)
 Ludwig Feuerbach and the End of Classical German Philosophy by Friedrich Engels (1886)
 Philosophical anthropology

Notes

References
 Van. A. Harvey, et al. Feuerbach and the Interpretation of Religion (Studies in Religion and Critical Thought), 1997.
 Warren Breckman, Marx, the Young Hegelians and the Origins of Social Theory: Dethroning the Self, New York: Cambridge University Press, 1999.
 Ludwig Feuerbach, “The Essence of Christianity” in Religion and Liberal Culture, ed. Keith Michael Baker, vol. 8 of University of Chicago Readings in Western Civilization, ed. John W. Boyer and Julius Kirshner (Chicago: University of Chicago Press, 1987), 323-336.
 
 Ludwig Feuerbach (1804-1872) – biography in Issue 103 of Philosophy Now magazine.
 
 
 Smith, Simon, Beyond Realism: Seeking the Divine Other (Delaware/Malaga: Vernon Press, 2017)

External links

 
 
 
 
 Ludwig Feuerbach at Marxists Internet Archive

1804 births
1872 deaths
19th-century atheists
19th-century German male writers
19th-century German non-fiction writers
19th-century German philosophers
19th-century philosophers
Atheist philosophers
Critics of Christianity
Critics of religions
Epistemologists
German anthropologists
German atheists
German humanists
German male non-fiction writers
Heidelberg University alumni
Materialists
Metaphysicians
Ontologists
People from Landshut
People from the Electorate of Bavaria
Philosophers of culture
Philosophers of education
Philosophers of history
Philosophers of mind
Philosophers of religion
Political philosophers
German social commentators
Social philosophers
Spinoza scholars
Theorists on Western civilization
University of Erlangen-Nuremberg alumni